Kevin O'Connell (born April 29, 1967) is an American professional stock car racing driver. He last competed part-time in the 2017 Monster Energy NASCAR Cup Series, driving the No. 15 Chevrolet SS for Premium Motorsports.

Racing career
O'Connell ran in the Rolex Sports Car Series in 2006 for O'Connell Racing in the 6 Hours of Watkins Glen. O'Connell also ran two races in the 2012 season with Rick Ware Racing at Road America and Indianapolis Motor Speedway.

From 2007 to 2008, O'Connell ran four races in the K&N Pro Series West, with a best finish of 15th at Infineon Raceway in 2007. In 2013, O'Connell entered the NASCAR Whelen Euro Series race at Brands Hatch, becoming the first American to race in the series on a road course.

In 2008, O'Connell made his NASCAR Nationwide Series debut at Autódromo Hermanos Rodríguez in the No. 09 Chevrolet for O'Connell Racing, with his Rolex pit crew also servicing his NASCAR team, and Rolex teammate Kevin Roush serving as spotter. After starting 34th, O'Connell was involved in a crash with David Reutimann in turn 7 on lap 36, finishing 37th. In 2010, O'Connell joined Curb Racing in the No. 43 at Road America, finishing 34th after suffering an engine failure. On June 21, 2014, it was announced that O'Connell would run in the Nationwide races at Road America and Watkins Glen International in the No. 23 for Rick Ware Racing. In 2015, O'Connell drove the No. 13 Dodge Challenger for MBM Motorsports at Watkins Glen.

In 2017, it was announced that O'Connell would make his Monster Energy NASCAR Cup Series debut for Rick Ware Racing at Sonoma Raceway that summer. However, after the report came out Josh Bilicki said that he would drive the Sonoma race for the team. Instead, O'Connell drove the No. 15 for Premium Motorsports; after starting 36th, he finished 33rd.

Personal life
O'Connell is the first driver in NASCAR's top three series (Cup, Xfinity, Camping World Truck Series) to receive his master's degree.

Images

Motorsports career results

NASCAR
(key) (Bold – Pole position awarded by qualifying time. Italics – Pole position earned by points standings or practice time. * – Most laps led.)

Monster Energy Cup Series

Xfinity Series

K&N Pro Series East

K&N Pro Series West

Canadian Tire Series

Mexico Series

Whelen Euro Series - Elite 1

Whelen Euro Series - Elite 2

 Season still in progress
 Ineligible for series points

References

External links

 

Living people
1967 births
Sportspeople from Newport Beach, California
Racing drivers from California
NASCAR drivers
Rolex Sports Car Series drivers